The Rt Hon. Henry Maxwell, 7th Baron Farnham, K.P. (9 August 1799 – 20 August 1868), was an Irish peer, a Member of Parliament, an evangelical Orangeman and County Cavan landowner. During the hunger years of late 1820s and late 1840s, he was much reviled for evicting tenants and for offering relief only on condition of conversion to Protestantism.

Political career 
Lord Farnham was the son of The 6th Baron Farnham and Lady Anne Butler. In 1824, he was elected to the House of Commons for County Cavan and continued to occupy the seat as a Conservative until 1838. The latter year he succeeded his father to become t

he 7th Baron Farnham, inheriting the huge Farnham Estate in County Cavan, and subsequently served as an Irish Representative Peer from 1839 to 1868. He was made a Knight of St. Patrick in 1845.

In Parliament, Maxwell voted against Catholic relief, against parliamentary reform, and against provision for the Irish poor through tax on absentee landowners

Honours notwithstanding, Maxwell was regarded even in official circles as a particularly unfortunate example of an absentee. In 1823, Robert Peel, then Home Secretary, commented that "such men as Mr. Henry Maxwell, drawing enormous sums from Irish livings, and leading a profligate life at Boulogne, are the real enemies of the establishment".

Evicting and evangelizing landlord 
In 1827, the liberal lawyer George Ensor was asked James Warren Doyle, the Roman Catholic Bishop of Kildare and Leighlin, to investigate claims of hundreds of tenants converting to Protestantism on the Farnham estate. Ensor's reports assured the bishop that, such as they were, the conversions were a case of "souperism" and would not survive the then near-famine conditions in the area.

Maxwell, meanwhile, moved a resolution for establishing a subscription for the loyalist Brunswick Club at the county meeting in Cavan and was prominent in Protestant activities there and in Dublin, where he had become secretary of the Orange Order.

In the Great Famine from 1845, the estate again accused of souperism—Maxwell (now Lord Farnham) was opening his soup kitchens only to those who would abjure their Catholic faith and take Anglican communion in the established Church of Ireland. He also was seen to continue with evictions.

Death and commemoration 
Maxwell was killed with his wife, and about 30 others, in the Abergele railway disaster in August 1868. They in the  front carriage of the London to Holyhead express at Chester when it collided with a goods train carrying petroleum. Their incinerated remains, only identifiable from their pocket watches. He was succeeded in his title and estates by his brother, himself a former Conservative Member for Cavan, Somerset Richard (1803–84).

A statue in his honour was erected in Cavan, funded by a levy exacted on his tenants by his younger brother and heir.  It now stands outside Cavan County Council offices.

References 

Kidd, Charles, Williamson, David (editors). Debrett's Peerage and Baronetage (1990 edition). New York: St Martin's Press, 1990.
 Peerage of the British Empire – Baron Farnham
 Peerage and Baronetage of the British Empire – Baron Farnham
 
 
 Maxwell family genealogy, part 03, showing the Maxwell of Calderwood, Maxwell of Farnham (co. Cavan), and Maxwell of Finnebrogue families.

External links 
 

1799 births
1868 deaths
Knights of St Patrick
Members of the Parliament of the United Kingdom for County Cavan constituencies (1801–1922)
UK MPs 1820–1826
UK MPs 1826–1830
UK MPs 1830–1831
UK MPs 1831–1832
UK MPs 1832–1835
UK MPs 1835–1837
UK MPs 1837–1841
Farnham, B7
Politicians from County Cavan
19th-century Irish people
Irish representative peers
7
Accidental deaths in Wales
Railway accident deaths in the United Kingdom